V. Krishna Rao (13 November 1925 – 2 December 2005, Nakkalahalli, Gauribidanur Taluk, Chikkballapur district (Karnataka)) was a leader of Indian National Congress from Karnataka. He served as member of the Lok Sabha representing Chikkaballapur (Lok Sabha constituency). He was elected to 8th, 9th and 10th Lok Sabha.

Early life
Father's name - Shri Venkataramanappa

Date of birth - 13 November 1925

Place of birth - Nakkalahalli, Taluk Gauribidanur in Distt. Kolar (Karnataka)

Married - in 1943

Spouse - Smt. Kamalamma

Children - Three sons and five daughters

Agriculturist and Social Worker

Address - P.O. Nakkalahall, Taluk Gauribidanur, Distt. Kolar (Karnataka)

Career
1. Member, Karnataka Legislative Assembly (Gauribidanur constituency).

2. Elected to Lok Sabha (Eighth Lok Sabha).

3. Re-elected to Lok Sabha (Ninth Lok Sabha).

4. Elected to Lok Sabha (Tenth Lok Sabha) for the third time.

5. Member, Committee on Government Assurances.

6. Member, Consultative Committee.

7. Ministry of Water Resources.

8. President, Taluk Congress Committee, Gauribidanur, General Secretary, D.C.C., Kolar; Vice-President, D.C.C., Kolar.

9. President, Red Cross Society.

10. Vice-President, Rotary Club.

11. President, Kustaroganivarana; President, Adiramaiah High School, Dpalaya.

Death
On 2 December 2005, in Nakkalahalli, Gauribidanur Taluk, Chikkballapur district, Karnataka

https://www.thehindu.com/todays-paper/tp-miscellaneous/tp-others/v-krishna-rao-passes-away/article27523468.ece

References

 V. Krishna Rao passes away

2.Karnataka Pradesh Congress Committee

India MPs 1991–1996
People from Kolar district
1925 births
2005 deaths
India MPs 1989–1991
India MPs 1984–1989
Lok Sabha members from Karnataka
Karnataka MLAs 1978–1983
Indian National Congress politicians from Karnataka